The Jaguariaíva River is a river of Paraná state in southern Brazil. It is a tributary of the Itararé River, which it joins on the border with the state of São Paulo.

Part of the Jaguariaíva River Canyon is protected by the  Cerrado State Park, created in 1992.

See also
List of rivers of Paraná

References

Rivers of Paraná (state)
Jaguariaíva